$100 hamburger ("hundred-dollar hamburger") is aviation slang for the excuse a general aviation pilot might use to fly.

Background
A $100 hamburger trip typically involves flying a short distance (less than two hours), eating at an airport restaurant, and then flying home.  "$100" originally referred to the approximate cost of renting or operating a light general aviation aircraft, such as a Cessna 172, for the time it took to fly round-trip to a nearby airport.  However, increasing fuel prices have since caused an increase in hourly operating costs for most airplanes, and a Cessna 172 now costs US$95–$180 per Hobbs hour to rent, including fuel.

In Perth, Western Australia, a similar mentality resulted in the 'Rotto Bun Run'. A group of pilots who had run out of hot cross buns on Good Friday decided to fly to the closest open bakery on Rottnest Island. The run is now an annual charity event.

References

General aviation
English-language slang
Metaphors referring to food and drink